|}

This is a list of House of Assembly results for the 1956 South Australian state election.

Results by electoral district

Adelaide 

 Two candidate preferred vote was estimated.

Albert

Alexandra

Angas

Barossa

Burnside

Burra

Chaffey

Edwardstown

Enfield 

 Two party preferred vote was estimated.

Eyre 

 Preferences were not distributed.

Flinders

Frome 

 Two party preferred vote was estimated.

Gawler

Glenelg 

 Two party preferred vote was estimated.

Gouger

Gumeracha

Hindmarsh

Light

Millicent

Mitcham

Mount Gambier

Murray

Norwood

Onkaparinga

Port Adelaide 

 Two candidate preferred vote was estimated.

Port Pirie

Ridley

Rocky River

Semaphore

Stirling

Stuart

Torrens 

 Two party preferred vote was estimated.

Unley 

 Two party preferred vote was estimated.

Victoria

Wallaroo

West Torrens 

 Two party preferred vote was estimated.

Whyalla

Yorke Peninsula

See also
 Candidates of the 1956 South Australian state election
 Members of the South Australian House of Assembly, 1956–1959

References

1956
1956 elections in Australia
1950s in South Australia